The Denham Harman Research Award is a lifetime achievement award given by the American Aging Association to researchers who have given outstanding contributions to research on aging over the course of their careers.

Past Recipients
Past recipients include Nathan Shock, Bruce Ames, Earl Stadtman, Caleb Finch, Arlan Richardson, Mark A. Smith, David Andrew Sinclair and George Perry.

References

American awards
Lifetime achievement awards